Charles William FitzGerald, 4th Duke of Leinster,  (30 March 1819 – 10 February 1887), styled Marquess of Kildare until 1874, was an Anglo-Irish peer and politician.

Background
Leinster was born in Dublin, Ireland. He was the son of Augustus FitzGerald, 3rd Duke of Leinster and Lady Charlotte Augusta Stanhope.

Political career
Leinster was High Sheriff of Kildare for 1843 and Member of Parliament for Kildare from 1847 to 1852. In 1870 he was granted a seat in the House of Lords as Baron Kildare in the peerage of the United Kingdom; he succeeded his father as Duke in 1874.

Death
He died in Carton House.

Family
Leinster married Lady Caroline Sutherland-Leveson-Gower (15 April 1827 - Kilkea Castle, 13 May 1887), daughter of the Duke and Duchess of Sutherland, on 12 or 13 October 1847 at Trentham, Staffordshire, England. They had 15 children: 
Lady Geraldine FitzGerald (c. 1848 – 15 November 1867)
Lady Mabel FitzGerald (c. 1849 – 13 September 1850)
Gerald FitzGerald, 5th Duke of Leinster (16 August 1851 – 1 December 1893)
Lord Maurice FitzGerald (Carton, 16 December 1852 – Johnstown Castle, 24 April 1901), married at Longford on 13 April 1880 Lady Adelaide Forbes (Dublin, 21 August 1860 – 18 November 1942).
Lady Alice FitzGerald (Carton, 12 December 1853 – 16 December 1941), married at Carton House on 2 May 1882 Sir Charles John Oswald FitzGerald (1840–1912); their daughter Mabel was later alleged to have been the secret wife of Alfred, Hereditary Prince of Saxe-Coburg and Gotha
Lady Eva FitzGerald (Kilkea Castle, 11 January 1855 – 13 February 1931), unmarried and without issue
Lady Mabel FitzGerald (Kilkea Castle, 16 December 1855 – 8 December 1939), unmarried and without issue
Major Lord Frederick FitzGerald (18 January 1857 – 8 March 1924), unmarried and without issue
Lord Walter FitzGerald (22 January 1858 – 31 July 1923), Captain 60th Rifles, antiquary; unmarried and without issue
Lord Charles FitzGerald (Kilkea Castle, 20 August 1859 – 28 June 1928), married in Calcutta on 21 November 1887 Alice Sidonia Claudius (died July 1909).
Lord George FitzGerald (16 February 1862 – 23 February 1924)
Lord Henry FitzGerald (Kilkea Castle, 9 August 1863 – 31 May 1955), married in Taplow on 21 January 1891 Inez Charlotte Grace Boteler (Taplow, 18__ - 1967).
Lady Nesta FitzGerald (Kilkea Castle, 5 April 1865 – 7 December 1944), unmarried and without issue
Lady Margaret FitzGerald (c. 1866 – 26 October 1867)
Lord Robert FitzGerald (23 December 1868 – 23 December 1868)

Works
 The Earls of Kildare and their Ancestors: From 1057 to 1773. Hodges, Smith & Co., Dublin 1858.

References
[S37] Charles Mosley, editor, Burke's Peerage, Baronetage & Knightage, 107th edition, 3 volumes (Wilmington, Delaware, U.S.A.: Burke's Peerage (Genealogical Books) Ltd, 2003), volume 2, page 1629.

Notes

External links 
 

Charles
1819 births
1887 deaths
Fitzgerald, Charles
Fitzgerald, Charles
Fitzgerald, Charles
Fitzgerald, Charles
Members of the Privy Council of Ireland
High Sheriffs of Kildare
Dukes of Leinster (1766)
Peers of the United Kingdom created by Queen Victoria